Sherry is a fictional character in the comic book series The Walking Dead and is portrayed by Christine Evangelista in the American television series of the same name and its companion series Fear the Walking Dead.

In the comic book series, Sherry is Dwight's wife, during the arrival of the saviors a group that extorted communities and intimidated people asking for supplies in exchange for protection against zombies, this group is led by Negan and Sherry was captured and taken as part of his Harem, which is why Dwight committed atrocities with the Saviors to avoid a retaliation against his wife, after the fall of Negan, Dwight and Sherry begin to distance themselves, in the arrival of the Whisperers, Sherry commanded a group of Saviors and waited for Rick Grimes and his group to get rid of the new threat. Sherry accused Rick of turning like Negan and started a fight with the cop, who pushed her towards a dining room table, causing her to break her neck and killing her instantly.

In the television series, Sherry is also Dwight's wife, and has a sister, Tina, flee the Saviors, fed up with Negan's reign of terror. They encounter Daryl Dixon, who helps them escape but Sherry and Dwight betrays Daryl, stealing his crossbow and his motorcycle, later Sherry is taken by Negan as part of his Harem, during Daryl's captivity, Sherry helps him escape and she mysteriously flees, which causes Dwight to join the ranks of Rick's group as a double agent, after the fall of Negan Dwight decides to go find Sherry until he finds her whereabouts in Fear the Walking Dead where it is revealed that she belongs to a rebel group against The Pioners, a group similar to the Saviors led by Virginia.

In January 2020, it was announced that Evangelista will reprise her role as Sherry in a series regular by in the sixth season of Fear the Walking Dead which began airing on October 11, 2020, Sherry is the third character to join the spin-off series, where she is reunited with Dwight revealing her whereabouts.

Appearances

Comic book series
While Sherry was trying to comfort Amber, Carl and Negan entered the room where they were both, the leader of the Saviors intended to discuss a very sensitive matter with Amber. Sherry tried to defend and excuse her friend, but Negan simply silenced her to continue, after witnessing Amber's suffering, Sherry witnessed how her lover, Mark, had her face burned by Negan himself, as punishment for having become involved with one of her wives.

After seeing her friend destroyed hers, Sherry took it upon herself to comfort her and prevent her from making any more mistakes, Sherry tried to speak to Dwight in some sign of forgiveness, but the annoyed Dwight refused to listen, and they both followed her path. Sherry witnesses how Negan spoke to Holly with her metaphorical words when he mistakes her for being Rick's love, which was Andrea. Sherry helps a depressed Mark to look for a missing Amber, when Mark supposes that the woman should be with someone else, Sherry clarifies that she was not like that and urges him to keep looking, when Dwight was about to leave the Sanctuary, he observed for the last time the place where he saw Sherry looking at him sadly as he left.

After Vincent's arrival at the Sanctuary with the intention of asking the Saviors to join the war, Sherry rejected the proposal and when the Alexandrine's horse was stripped, the woman ordered Tara to go find him. Later, Sherry revealed to Tara that when Rick and his group were weakened after winning the war against The Whisperers, they attacked, following their malevolent plan, Sherry commanded a group of Saviors and waited for Rick and his group to leave, get rid of the new threat, after ambushing Dwight and his group in the middle of a mission, Sherry allowed one of her companions to finish off her former husband.

After arriving in the Alexandria Safe Zone with her group, Sherry showed her anger at the officer about being part of their intercommunal alliance and clarified that they would no longer be in it. When Rick offered to talk about what happened, Sherry accused Rick of turning like Negan and started a fight against the officer, who pushed the bandit towards a dining room table, causing her to break her neck and killing her instantly.

Television series
After the outbreak occurred, Sherry, Dwight and her sister Tina and two teenagers named Carla and Delly were forced into the forest to escape a large group of walkers, but Carla and Delly were separated from them. Sherry set fire to the forest to kill all the walkers within it but this indirectly resulted in Carla and Delly's deaths. The three later came into contact with The Saviors led by Negan, a group of survivors who extorted other communities into giving them supplies by force and were offered protection in exchange for their service which they agreed, but came to see that Negan was a tyrant. They eventually grew resentful of "kneeling" and the three, along with a truck full of supplies named Patty, escaped from the community. However, men were sent to find the four and ambushed them on a road 20 miles away from the Alexandria Safe-Zone, and were separated from Patty.

Season 6

In the episode "Always Accountable", thinking that he was part of the Saviors, Sherry, Dwight and Tina force him to continue on his way with them with the intention of exchanging him in exchange for his liberation. Unfortunately, her companions perished at the hands of the walkers and for a long time from Tina, Daryl ended up running away with Tina's medication, rendering her unconscious in the arms of her Sherry. After being taken by surprise by Daryl, he forced them to divest himself of his possessions in exchange for insulin for Tina. Unfortunately, The Saviors made the presence of him claiming the fugitives. Collaborating with Daryl, Sherry, Dwight, and Tina avoided capture and continued to roam the forest. After losing Tina to the walkers and burying her, Sherry and Dwight again assaulted Daryl, stripping him of his motorcycle and his crossbow, mysteriously fleeing. 

Eventually, Dwight ended up surrendering to the latent threat from the Saviors and returning to Sanctuary, where she begged Negan for mercy to spare her Sherry for her actions. Negan ended up accepting her pleas and later spared her life after Sherry decided to marry him, although in her place Dwight ended up receiving a terrible punishment which disfigured much of her face.(Twice as Far).

Season 7

In the episode "The Cell" due to a possible pregnancy, Sherry visited the office of Doctor Emmett Carson of the Sanctuary to be checked, until the appearance of Dwight and the new prisoner of the place with the intention that the latter would be examined by the doctor. Upon seeing the stranger, she Sherry recognized him as the person they had previously met and revealed to her ex-partner that her pregnancy test had come back negative. When Daryl tried to escape from his cell by being left open, Sherry quickly found the man and advised him not to do such a thing and suggested that he return to his cell or else he would be punished by the bandits, but the hunter nevertheless refused. at the insistence of the woman and continued on his way until eventually being captured by the thugs. Feeling guilty about what she had done earlier, Sherry apologized to Daryl for stealing his motorcycle and crossbow some time ago and reminded him of what the hunter had told them at the time they had stolen his belongings. Later, she Sherry meets her old partner and they start smoking together on a staircase, where they talk about her decision to rejoin the Saviors and enter Negan's regime.

In the episode "Sing Me a Song" with Carl's arrival at the Los Salvadores compound, Sherry watched as Negan showed the boy the place where he kept his Harem of wives and tried to convince the infamous leader to treat Amber well despite his affair with Mark (his royal partner). After seeing the conversation between Negan and the girl accused of treason, Sherry passionately kissed Negan before the stunned eyes of Dwight and Daryl who had entered the room. During Mark's punishment by Negan for having an affair with Amber, Sherry along with the other rescuers observed how the rescue footman suffered the punishment of the iron. Later, Sherry met Dwight again for a smoke where she reminded her ex-husband that the deal she had made with Negan should only affect him, but Dwight pointed out that if he was still alive, it was always at someone's expense.

In the episode "Hostiles and Calamities" feeling the weight of his actions on her shoulders, Sherry helped Daryl escape from his cell assisting him in secret and after achieving his mission, he fled the Sanctuary without anyone noticing. While making inquiries as to who had helped the prisoner escape, Dwight recognized Sherry's handwriting in the note they found in Daryl's cell and so to protect her, he framed Dr. Carson and made him look like the responsible person in their eyes. of Negan. When Negan tasked Dwight with finding Sherry and bringing her back, the man went on a campaign and traveled to the house they had both lived in before the apocalypse and inside he found traces that she had been there recently and finally stumbled upon a envelope containing a letter addressed to him and his wedding ring. In the letter, Sherry explained that she felt bad for allowing Dwight to transform into a person that he did not want to be and apologized for having forced him into Negan's world, also telling him that although she did not know if he would survive in it. The outside world preferred to live there rather than under the yoke of the Saviors. Recognizing that Sherry had left and would never return, Dwight returned to Sanctuary with the story that he saw her die at the hands of walkers so that Negan would stop looking for her.

Fear the Walking Dead

Season 6

In the episode "Alaska", when Al turns on the radio to communicate with the Pioneers, she and Dwight hear a voice on the radio questioning them if they need help, as he has seen Al's signal flash. Recognizing Sherry's voice, Dwight picks up the radio and asks if it is her, surprising Sherry. Running out into the street, Dwight finds Sherry near her and they run into each other's arms and hug.

In the episode "Honey", Sherry reveals to Dwight that she belongs to a rebel group against the Pioneers, he is ready to help her, then Morgan Jones appears who also joins the group, later Sherry reveals that the group's plan is to kill Virginia and her henchmen, Morgan refuses to participate in the massacre and Sherry and decides to lock up Morgan and then Dwight to proceed with the massacre somehow Dwight manages to escape and Sherry who was recent and hurt from Negan's oppression reluctantly stops the attack the Pioneers since Dwight manages to convince her but at the cost of this they both separate again.

Development and reception 
Sherry is portrayed by Christine Evangelista. The character entered the recurring cast beginning with the episode "Always Accountable" of the sixth season. Kelly Lawler of USA Today reviewed the seventh season episode "The Cell", saying, "Sherry's wearing heels and sundresses and pregnant with Negan’s baby and Dwight is chasing down defectors and eating egg sandwiches and looking generally depressed. Yay?"

Christine Evangelista was promoted to a series regular starting with the sixth season for the spin-off of the series Fear the Walking Dead being the third character to enter the crossover of the series. Evangelista learned in winter 2019 that she would reprise her character on Fear, and when filming her scenes she was taken to the set separately from the other actors using umbrellas to hide her, to keep her return more secret. During an interview with Mike Bloom who writes for CBR.com, Bloom asked him about what his fans think about his return to the franchise and Evangelista replied: "The fans are extraordinary on this show. I got such wonderful messages. It couldn't have been more positive. I think it was such an earned moment between these two characters. All the fans felt that. I got messages of people crying audibly in the background as they watched our reunion. I think it's kind of symbolic. We've all been in this isolation for so long; we've been away from our loved ones. I think there was a true sentiment people felt. It made me feel really good."

In a review of the sixth season episode "Alaska" in which Sherry returns, Erik Kain of Forbes wrote: "yeah, it's Sherry. Of course it's Sherry. And of course Fear The Walking Dead reunites Dwight and Sherry after all this time with a fracking walkie talkie [...] The sheer coincidence of Sherry and Dwight running into each other after all this time in the middle of nowhere Texas is already a ridiculous stretch of plausibility, but to have it occur via walkie talkie is just insulting." Kirsten Acuna from Insider commented that "In what was one of the most satisfying moments in "The Walking Dead" universe in a long time, Dwight and Sherry, played by Christine Evangelista, were finally reunited at the episode's end, culminating in an emotional alleyway embrace." Cameron Bonomolo of Comicbook wrote about Sherry's character development in his review and wrote: "So I think that had some things to do with scheduling along the way, but again, I just think it makes everything else that's happening right now just so much more earned," Evangelista said. "And [it's] this moment that I [not only] think is really fulfilling for me creatively, but I think for fans too. It's nice to have something like a glimmer of hope. It's really something to hold on to and hope for. And in the world of Fear the Walking Dead and The Walking Dead, all these people have is hope."

Paul Daily writing for TV Fanatic reviewed the episode "Honey", writing: "Negan was a merciless ruler, and his reign of terror had a profound effect on both Dwight and Sherry, to the point that either one of them would still kill him if they got the chance. That could explain why Sherry was so intent on murdering Virginia without having the resources to take down her army. I appreciated the way Sherry wanted to do the deed, but I enjoyed the emotional dilemma she had when Dwight urged her not to pull the trigger." Emily Hannemann of TV Insider wrote: "I knew when Dwight and Sherry got their episode, it wasn't going to be all sunshine and rainbows. What I loved about this is how it played off its 'source material,' so to speak — Dwight and Sherry never really escaped Negan's shadow, even though they went all the way to Texas in the attempt. There's something chilling about that, and it's a message Seasons 4 and 5 of this show never would've endeavored to send." David S.E. Zapanta from Den of Geek! and wrote: "In the end, Dwight is foiled by Sherry herself. She sees his slow fall from grace and fears he may revert to who he was within Negan's walls. As it is, she blames herself for allowing Negan to be a monstrous presence in everyone's lives. In other words, she's suffered one tyrant too many [...] Sherry's own transformation seems to come out of left field, especially when you consider she kept this masked faction from Dwight."

Erik Kain of Forbes said in a review of the episode "Things Left to Do", about Sherry arguing with Morgan: "shut up Sherry. You're an awful character. And you keep getting worse [...] Angry Sherry tells Sad Dwight that even though he's spent years looking for her, she'd rather bone her new friends. She’s into masks, maybe (though I'm sure Dwight wouldn't turn her down if she asked him to wear one). It's kind of a lame reunion and has been ever since he found her in the first place. A gimmicky, pointless, ultimately kind of depressing conclusion to Dwight's Epic Quest for Wifey. C'est la vie." Kain also commented in his review of "Handle with Care" that "Sherry continues to be awful and at this point I’m more annoyed by her than by the gimmick of bringing her back to the show. Maybe a zombie will get her." Writing for "TV Fanatic", Paul Daily reviewed the same episode and wrote: "Sherry is another character getting the time to shine. Christine Evangelista was basically a guest star on the main series. Getting to see this other side to Sherry as she tries to put her past with Negan behind her while simultaneously trying to keep it together has been exciting. The character feels grounded in reality, and her complicated relationship with Dwight shows no signs of slowing down."

References 

Characters created by Robert Kirkman
Comics characters introduced in 2012
Fear the Walking Dead
Fictional torturers
Female characters in television
Fictional characters from Virginia
Fictional women soldiers and warriors
Fictional zombie hunters
The Walking Dead (franchise) characters